Guillermo "Billy" Ford Boyd (November 11, 1936 – March 19, 2011) was the Second Vice President of Panama. He was one of the running mates of presidential candidate Guillermo Endara during the 1989 Panamanian election campaign. The election results were annulled by the Noriega regime before counting finished after it had been shown that Endara and Ford's coalition was leading Noriega's backed candidate by a 3 to 1 margin.

After a rally in support of Endara and Ford, members of the Dignity Battalions, armed with guns, pipes, and wooden planks, attacked Ford and his entourage. A photo of the attack on Ford by a member of the Dignity Battalions appeared on the cover of Time magazine, Newsweek, and U.S. News. The iconic photo by Ron Haviv (of AFP), of Ford in his white guayabera shirt splattered bright red with blood became one of the most famous images of 1989.  United States president George H. W. Bush referred to the Dignity Battalions as "doberman thugs" in a press conference that he held on 13 May 1989.

During the Invasion of Panama on 20 December 1989, U.S. officials swore Endara in as president on a United States military base in the Canal Zone and Ford was appointed as vice president. Ford served as vice president from the end of 1989 until 1994.

Ford died March 19, 2011, in his residency in Panama City, Republic of Panama, and he received a state funeral.  The Panamanian National Assembly also honored him with a special resolution.

References

1939 births
2011 deaths
Vice presidents of Panama
Nationalist Republican Liberal Movement politicians
People from Panama City